Dieter Althaus (born 29 June 1958 in Heiligenstadt/Eichsfeld) is a German politician of the Christian Democratic Union (CDU). He served as the 3rd Minister President of Thuringia from 2003 to 2009. In 2003/04 he was the 58th President of the Bundesrat.

Early career
Althaus was a teacher for Physics and Mathematics at the Polytechnic Secondary School in Geismar, Thuringia, from 1983 to 1989, where he became deputy headteacher in 1987.

Political career
Since 1985 Althaus has been a member of the CDU, remaining with the party as it transformed itself from a loyal supporter of the GDR's ruling Socialist Unity Party of Germany (SED) to a loyal supporter of the West German party of the same name with which it merged in 1990 shortly after German reunification. In 2000 he became chairman of the CDU in Thuringia. Since 1990 he has been a member of the Thuringian Landtag.

In 1992 he became a member of Bernhard Vogel's cabinet as State Minister of Cultural Affairs and Education.

On 5 June 2003 Althaus was elected Minister President of Thuringia; he succeeded Bernhard Vogel, who had resigned for reasons of age. As Minister-President he served as President of the Bundesrat in 2003/04. Althaus was also part of the CDU/CSU team in the negotiations with the SPD on a coalition agreement following the 2005 federal elections, which paved the way to the formation of Chancellor Angela Merkel’s first government.

After the Thuringia elections of 2009, where the CDU went from having an absolute majority to not even having enough seats to form a majority coalition with the FDP, Althaus resigned as Minister-President and as chairman of the CDU in Thuringia.

Later career
Althaus was nominated by his party as delegate to the Federal Convention for the purpose of electing the President of Germany in 2022.

Political views
In 2006 Althaus spoke out in favour of a universal basic income.

Other activities
 Central Committee of German Catholics, Member
 Gegen Vergessen – Für Demokratie, Member of the Board

Personal life

2009 skiing accident 
Althaus caused a skiing collision in Styria, Austria on 1 January 2009 in which he suffered severe injuries. Althaus was skiing down an expert run, but wandered onto an easy slope, where he was skiing in the wrong direction, whereupon he and a 41-year-old Slovak woman collided. The woman subsequently died from her injuries. Althaus was wearing a skiing helmet, while the woman was not. Althaus was fined €33,300 for negligent homicide.

Family 
Althaus is married to Katharina and has two children.

References

External links 
  Official website
  Telegraph article

1958 births
Living people
People from Heilbad Heiligenstadt
German Roman Catholics
Presidents of the German Bundesrat
Christian Democratic Union (East Germany) politicians
Christian Democratic Union of Germany politicians
Members of the Landtag of Thuringia
German people convicted of manslaughter
German politicians convicted of crimes
Ministers-President of Thuringia